Thomas Anthony Kyne (4 February 1905 – 8 August 1981) was an Irish Labour Party politician and trade union official. He first stood for election at the Waterford by-election in 1947 but was unsuccessful. He was elected to Dáil Éireann as a Labour Party Teachta Dála (TD) for the Waterford constituency at the 1948 general election and was re-elected at each general election until he lost his seat at the 1969 general election. 

He was re-elected at the 1973 general election and retired from politics at the 1977 general election.

References

1905 births
1981 deaths
Labour Party (Ireland) TDs
Members of the 13th Dáil
Members of the 14th Dáil
Members of the 15th Dáil
Members of the 16th Dáil
Members of the 17th Dáil
Members of the 18th Dáil
Members of the 20th Dáil
Politicians from County Waterford
Irish trade unionists